David Montgomery may refer to:
David Montgomery (historian) (1927–2011), American historian at Yale
David Montgomery, 2nd Viscount Montgomery of Alamein (1928–2020), British politician
David Montgomery (newspaper executive) (born 1948), British newspaper executive
David Montgomery (baseball) (1946–2019), American president and CEO of the Philadelphia Phillies
David Montgomery (American football) (born 1997), American football player
David Henry Montgomery (1837–1928), American author of history books
David R. Montgomery, American professor of earth and space sciences, University of Washington
David C. Montgomery (1870–1917), American comedic actor with Fred Stone
David Montgomery (photographer) (born 1937), American portrait photographer
David Montgomery (cyclist) (born 1995), Irish professional cyclist